Ostereo is a UK-based record label, publisher, influencer, and marketing company using technology to promote streams and video views for its artists. The organization is also known for providing management services. Ostereo was founded in April 2016 by Howard Murphy. In late 2019, Ostereo launched a new Management division.

History
In 2010, Blackpool-born Howard Murphy founded Amurco, a music sync and licensing agency servicing brands and broadcasters such as Ferrari, IKEA, Netflix and MTV. Murphy launched Ostereo in Manchester in 2016. Its business model is to combine the aspects of the traditional music industry, with technology and data to promote artists and build their careers in the modern day media industry. To this end, the company places emphasis on social media such as Facebook, Instagram and Twitter, user-generated-content platforms like YouTube, TikTok and music streaming services like Spotify, Apple Music and Deezer. Ostereo is located at The Landing at MediaCityUK, a hub for high-growth technology.

Model of Operation 
Ostereo is known for working with artists, writers and producers for whom it acts as a label, management agency and publisher. The company and its artists earn their income from music streaming, performance royalties, YouTube ad revenue, live performances, merchandise and other performative activities. In its first year of operation, Ostereo placed its artists across different digital service providers that received 400 million music streams and over 1 billion YouTube views.

Artists 
One of the first few artists whom Ostereo promoted, Joel Corry, released his single, Sunlight, through Ostereo in 2017. Joel Corry established his DJ profile on MTV's Geordie Shore and his career as a bodybuilding competitor at bodybuilding performances at WBFF, UKBFF, Pure Elite and Miami Pro events. He has completed a club tour of the United Kingdom. Later, Corry reached number 1 in the UK singles charts through his collaboration with MNEK, Head & Heart, released in July 2020.

In March 2018, Ostereo released Dutch singer-songwriter Nina June's album, Bon Voyage. Prior to that, the track "For Love" received over four million Spotify listens, and along with "When We Fall" was used in Dutch, Belgian and American films and television programs. Jimmy Choo, LK Bennett, Hobbs and Farrow & Ball added "Til Dawn" to their global in-store playlists.

In late 2019, Ostereo released the debut singles Good Vibe, Are U My Villain and Starlight from Korean pop sensation, J.Fla. In their first six months they have accumulated over 10 million streams and views across global music platforms. J.Fla has reached the charts in Singapore, Taiwan, Korea and China by implementing peer-to-peer approach and an engaging online presence. As of August 2020, Fla has amassed over 16 million subscribers on her YouTube channel.

In 2019, Ostereo released Chapter 11, the debut album of London-based singer songwriter, Mysie. The EP received critical acclaim and saw Mysie featured on the Independent’s Ones to Watch, secure radio attention from BBC 6 Music and a slot at The Great Escape in May 2020. In 2020, Mysie was awarded an Ivor Novello in the Rising Star Awards category.

Bulgarian artist VICTORIA signed to the label in late 2019 and her first release under Ostereo, Tears Getting Sober, was the Bulgarian entry for the 2020 Eurovision Song Contest. The single was widely touted as the bookies’ favorite to win the competition.

Pianist Karim Kamar's Small Mvmnts album, released in May 2020 under Ostereo, received considerable attention from listeners and publications including The Independent.

Ostereo Publishing 
In late 2019, John Saunderson joined Ostereo after serving at Notting Hill Music for 15 years. Ostereo Publishing has, since inception, landed a number of opportunities for its writers including a sync placement on a New Balance advert for artist/writer Bamtone primarily for a Facebook campaign.

In October 2020, Ostereo concluded a deal with Distiller Music, which sees Ostereo act as sub-publisher for Distiller's publishing catalogue and roster of writers and producers. Distiller were previously working with Kobalt in this regard.

Cuts with major artists have been commonplace for the young publishing company since launch, including Rob Jones TV featuring on Dizzee Rascal's E3 AF album, released in October 2020 and Able Faces’ cut on Marc Benjamin's ‘Losing Focus’ released in the same year.

Partnerships 
In 2020, Ostereo completed deals with Peermusic UK and Sony Music Japan to administer their publishing royalties and ensure their artists are properly remunerated for the use of their music.

References

External links
Official website

English record labels
Record labels established in 2016
Rock record labels
2016 establishments in England